better known simply as H.Y.O is a Japanese professional wrestler currently working for the Japanese promotion Dragon Gate where he is a former Open the Brave Gate Champion, Open the Twin Gate Champion and Open the Triangle Gate Champion.

Professional wrestling career

Dragon Gate (2016–present)
Watanabe made his professional wrestling debut in Dragon Gate at Dragon Gate NEX Sanctuary.141, an event promoted on April 22, 2016, where he defeated Katsumi Takashima in a dark match. After a few years of rookie status, he eventually began chasing various championships, and capturing the Open the Triangle Gate Championship alongside Takashi Yoshida and Diamante after defeating Strong Machine J, Strong Machine F and Strong Machine G at Kobe Pro-Wrestling Festival 2019 on July 21. At Final Gate 2021 on December 26, Watanabe teamed up with R.E.D. stablemate SB Kento to win the Open the Twin Gate Championship from Naruki Doi and Takashi Yoshida. His biggest accomplishment to date is the Open the Brave Gate Championship, title which he has first won at Kobe World 2022 on July 30 after defeating Dragon Dia. On February 4, 2022, on the first night of the DG Truth Gate, it was revealed that the unit of R.E.D. was rebranded as Z-Brats, thus ending the initial stable's tenure as the main heel unit. Watanabe remained part of the new group ever since.

Watanabe is known for competing in various of the promotion's signature events, such as the King of Gate tournament, making first appearance at the 2020 edition where he fell short to Kzy in the first rounds. At the 2021 edition, he placed himself in the "Block C" where he failed to score any points after competing against Yamato, Shun Skywalker, Kaito Ishida and U-T. At the 2022 edition, he fought into a double disqualification against Dragon Dia which attracted an elimination for both of them from the first rounds.

Watanabe competed in the Gate of Destiny series of pay-per-views, which is considered to be the promotion's top yearly event. He made his first appearance at the 2016 edition where he teamed up with Shun Skywalker and Futa Nakamura and defeated Over Generation (Punch Tominaga, Kaito Ishida and Takehiro Yamamura) as a result of a six-man tag team match. One year later at the 2017 edition, he fell short to Skywalker in a Dark match. At the 2018 edition, Watanabe teamed up with Natural Vibes (Punch Tominaga and "brother" Yasshi in a losing effort against Don Fujii, Gamma and Ryo Saito. In 2019, Watanabe joined the R.E.D. stable, and at the year's "Gate of Destiny" on November 3, he teamed up with stablemates Kazma Sakamoto, Takashi Yoshida and Diamante, and fought Genki Horiguchi, K-ness, Super Shisa and Último Dragón into a double count-out. At the 2020 edition, he teamed up with stablemates BxB Hulk, Dia Inferno in a losing effort against Team Dragon Gate (Ben-K, Dragon Dia and Strong Machine J). His latest aparition was at the 2022 edition of the event where he successfully defended the Open the Brave Gate Championship against Dragon Kid.

Independent circuit (2017–present)
Watanabe rarely competed for several promotions from the Japanese independent scene. At Osaka Pro Wrestling Rainy Season Sky Fly Away on June 2, 2018, he teamed up with Oji Shiiba and Yuki Yoshioka to defeat Kuishinbo Kamen, Tsubasa and Ultimate Spider Jr. At Majestic 2022 - N Innovation, an event promoted by Pro Wrestling Noah on April 29, Z-Brats stablemates SB Kento and Shun Skywalker to defeat Alejandro, Daisuke Harada and Junta Miyawaki.

Championships and accomplishments
Dragon Gate
Open the Brave Gate Championship (1 time)
Open the Twin Gate Championship (1 time) – with SB Kento
Open the Triangle Gate Championship (3 times) – with Eita and Kaito Ishida (2); Takashi Yoshida and Dimante (1)

References

1997 births
Living people
Japanese male professional wrestlers
People from Aichi Prefecture
Sportspeople from Aichi Prefecture
21st-century professional wrestlers